Kallala Dynasty or Kalyal Dynasty was the ruling dynasty of Jumla Kingdom formed by shahi Baliraj shahi after disintegration of Khasa kingdom. The capital of this dynasty was Svarnagrama.

Introduction
In the pre-historic time, the Jumla Valley might have been a lake like the Kathmandu Valley. It might have been made habitable by God Chandannath of Kashmir, who is said to have introduced the paddy crop there first, but in the medieval period this region was ruled by the renowned Mallas. Sinja and Dullu were the summer and the winter capitals of this vast Malla kingdom till King Prithivimalla, but during the rulership of his son King Abhayamalla both of these cities seized to be the Centers of the Malla administration. Now Udambarapuri becomes the residence of the king.

We don't know what happened to the Mallas of the west after Abhayamalla. Many people believe that Abhayamalla become childless and distributed his kingdom among his vassals of the Doti, Accham, Dullu and Jumla, while some think that there was a coup d'état from which the numerous small principalities have originated. There's not any factual proof, but it seems that the Mohammedan kings of Persia had wholly conquered India by the fourteenth century, and as they had generously facilitated the Mohammedan immigrants of their natives and in the newly acquired principalities, the Kshatriyas and the Rajppoot kings of Rajasthan and other parts of the country were frequently harassed by the Muslim section of the population.

In A.D. 1399 Taimur Lang of Persia had violently raided India. In the course of his invasion he had hundred, the might and eloquence of the Imperial Sultan of Delhi. At that time in the region of Rajasthan and Punjab about one hundred Hindus were slaughtered by the aggressor. These are some of the chief causes of the influx of a large number of the Kshatriya princes in the Western Himalaya during the opening decade of the fifteenth century A.D.

The Origin of the Dynasty
The Virendra Bahadur chronicle gives the names of 82 kings of the Kallala dynasty. According to this document, these kings of the Jumla valley were of the lunar dynasty, illustrious Ravi-gotra (solar padigree) and the Panchaparavara-sakha. The venerable deity of the family was Rudra and the sages of the family were Savarni, Chavanam, Jamadagni, Margava (Bhargava) and Apalava. Vailabhya Risi was the first (king) of the Kallala dynasty. Succeeding him we have 4 more seers (Risi), then 8 Adityas beginning from king Vijayaditya, after this 37 Ranas including King Salivahana (this king is also referred as a Rana) and then 5 Palas. Posterior to these Palas we get the names of eleven kings having their names ending with the suffix of Raj and Baliraj is the fifth Raj king in this chronicle. The father of the latter was King Uttimraj. After t Rajs we get names of tourteen Shahi and two Shaha Kings.

Kings of Jumla
Kings of Jumla are:
 Baliraja Rawal. 1404-1445
 Vaksaraja 1445-? (son)
 Vijayaraja (son)
 Visesaraja fl. 1498 (son)
 Vibhogaraja (?)
 Matiraja (?)
 Sahiraja (?)
 Bhanasahi c. 1529-90 (son)
 Saimalsahi c. 1590-1599 (son)
 Vasantaraja 1599-1602 (son)
 Visekaraja 1599-1602 (brother)
 Vikramasahi 1602-c. 1635 (brother)
 Bahadurasahi c. 1635-65 (son)
 Virabhadrasahi 1665-75
 Prithvipatisahi 1676-1719 (son)
 Surathasahi 1719-40 (son)
 Sudarasanasahi 1740-c. 1758 (son)
 Suryabhanasahi c. 1758-89 (son)

References

History of Nepal
Dynasties of Nepal
15th-century establishments in Nepal
18th-century disestablishments in Nepal